Saif Salman Hashim Al-Mohammedawi (born 1 July 1989) is an Iraqi footballer who plays as a midfielder for Samarra.

International career
On December 3, 2012 Saif made his full international debut against Bahrain in a friendly match, which ended 0-0.

International statistics

Iraq national under-20 team goals
Goals are correct excluding friendly matches and unrecognized tournaments such as Arab U-20 Championship.

Honours

International

Iraq U-20
 2012 AFC U-19 Championship: runner-up
 2013 FIFA U-20 World Cup: 4th Place

Iraq U23
AFC U-22 Championship: 2013

Iraq National football team
 2012 WAFF Championship: runner-up
 21st Arabian Gulf Cup: runner-up

References

External links
Profile on Goalzz

1989 births
Living people
Association football midfielders
Iraqi footballers
Footballers at the 2014 Asian Games
Asian Games medalists in football
Hajer FC players
Ittihad FC players
Al-Shorta SC players
Saudi Professional League players
Expatriate footballers in Saudi Arabia
Iraqi expatriate sportspeople in Saudi Arabia
Asian Games bronze medalists for Iraq
Medalists at the 2014 Asian Games
AFC Cup winning players
Iraq international footballers
Sportspeople from Baghdad
Duhok SC players
Erbil SC players
Al-Talaba SC players
Zakho FC players
Iraq youth international footballers
Iraqi expatriate footballers
Expatriate footballers in Oman
Iraqi expatriate sportspeople in Oman